The 1984 New South Wales Rugby League season was the 77th season of competition between the top professional rugby league football clubs within New South Wales. With the departure from the first grade competition of Sydney foundation club the Newtown Jets at the close of the previous season, 1984 saw thirteen teams compete for the J J Giltinan Shield and Winfield Cup during the season, which culminated in a grand final between the Canterbury-Bankstown and Parramatta clubs. NSWRL teams also competed for the 1984 National Panasonic Cup.

Season summary
The New South Wales Rugby Football League dropped the "football" from its name this year. Twenty-six regular season rounds were played from March till August, resulting in a top five of Canterbury, St. George, Parramatta and Manly, with Souths taking fifth spot after winning a play-off against Canberra

The 1984 season's Rothmans Medallist was Canterbury-Bankstown's five-eighth, Terry Lamb, who was also the season's top try-scorer. The Dally M Award was given to Canterbury's fullback, Michael Potter, while Rugby League Week gave their player of the year award to Parramatta's halfback, Peter Sterling.

Teams
At the close of the previous season Newtown became the first club since University in 1937 to exit the League, reducing the number of clubs this season from fourteen to thirteen. This included five Sydney-based foundation teams, another six from Sydney, one from greater New South Wales and one from the Australian Capital Territory.

Ladder

Finals

Chart

Grand final
The 1984 grand final was contested by minor premiers Canterbury-Bankstown Bulldogs and the Parramatta Eels. As competition leaders, the Bulldogs needed to win only one finals game to qualify for the grand final, and did so against the third-placed Eels, who had to play three finals games to qualify. Played at the Sydney Cricket Ground before a crowd of 47,076, the game was refereed by Kevin Roberts.

The ruthless game plan of coach Warren Ryan saw Canterbury trump Parramatta in a grueling encounter. The Bulldogs mastered the art of the "gang-tackle" under Ryan and it was executed superbly by Peter Tunks, Peter Kelly, Mark Bugden and Brian Battese. Parramatta had a 4-0 half-time lead after Mick Cronin scored from a neat Peter Sterling pass.

An ingenious moment from Canterbury hooker Bugden won the day - seeing an injured Ray Price on the ground, he ran from dummy-half at the place where Price would have been defending to crash over and score the winning try.

Cronin later missed a close range penalty goal attempt which would have levelled the scores close to full-time.

Canterbury-Bankstown 6Tries: BugdenGoals: Chris Mortimer

Parramatta 4
Tries: Cronin

Man-of-the-match: Peter Kelly

Player statistics
The following statistics are as of the conclusion of Round 26.

Top 5 point scorers

Top 5 try scorers

Top 5 goal scorers

References

External links
 Rugby League Tables - Season 1984 
Results:1981-90 at rabbitohs.com.au
1984 J J Giltinan Shield and Winfield Cup at rleague.com
NSWRL season 1984 at rugbyleagueproject.org

New South Wales Rugby League premiership
NSWRL season